The 1996–97 season was the 95th in the history of the Western Football League.

The league champions for the third time in their history (and the third time in four seasons) were Tiverton Town. The champions of Division One were Melksham Town.

Final tables

Premier Division
The Premier Division remained at 18 clubs after Crediton United and Frome Town were relegated to the First Division. Two clubs joined:

Bridgwater Town, champions of the First Division.
Chard Town, runners-up in the First Division.
Odd Down Athletic F.C. reverted to their former name of Odd Down F.C.

First Division
The First Division was increased from 19 clubs to 20, after Bridgwater Town and Chard Town were promoted to the Premier Division. Three clubs joined:

Crediton United, relegated from the Premier Division.
Frome Town, relegated from the Premier Division.
Yeovil Town Reserves, rejoining the league after leaving in 1991.

References

1996-97
8